This is a list of singles which have reached number one on the Irish Singles Chart in 1988.

29 Number Ones
Most weeks at No.1 (song): "The Boys in Green" - Republic of Ireland Soccer Squad, "Desire" - U2, "Orinoco Flow (Sail Away)" - Enya, "Mistletoe and Wine" - Cliff Richard (4)
Most weeks at No.1 (artist): Republic of Ireland Soccer Squad, U2, Enya, Cliff Richard (4)
Most No.1s: Tiffany, Bros, Kylie Minogue, Yazz (2)

See also
1988 in music
Irish Singles Chart
List of artists who reached number one in Ireland

1988 in Irish music
1988 record charts
1988